The São Vicente Association Cup (Portuguese: Taça de Associação de São Vicente, Capeverdean Crioulo, ALUPEC or ALUPEK: Tasa di Assosiason di San Visenti), then known as the São Vicente Opening Tournament is an association cup (equivalent to a league cup) played during the season in the island of São Vicente, Cape Verde. The competition is organized by the São Vicente Regional Football Association (Associação Regional de São Vicente de Futebol, ARSVF).  Until 2009, it featured 9 rounds and the club met once.  When the second division was introduced to the São Vicente Island League in 2009, the Opening Tournament became the Association Cup and featured two divisions.  It currently consists of seven rounds, a meeting with another club once.  The winner with the most points is the winner.

Mindelense won the most title numbering seven, it was the first club to win a title, their last was in 2013.  Derby became the second club to win in 2001.  Académica Mindelo became the third club to win a title in the following year.  Falcões do Norte was the fourth club to do so in 2004.  Mindelense twice won back to back from 2005 to 2009, between, Académica won their second title in 2007.  The 2010 edition was cancelled.  Derby won two back to back titles in 2012, Mindelense won their recent title in 2013.  The 2013-14 and the 2014-15 editions were cancelled, the latter was all the two divisions.  For the 2015-16 season which took place in January 2016, Amarante became the fifth club to win a title.  In December 2016, Batuque became the sixth club to win a title for the 2016-17 season.

Fifteen titles has won Mindelense has 7 titles, in 2013 it was half, now it is less than half numbering 46.67% out of 15 titles.  Derby is next which has three, 1/5 of the total.  Third is Académica Mindelo with two.  Three remaining has only a title won including Falcões do Norte, Amarante and recently Batuque

Winners

Premier Division

Performance By Club

Second Division
2016/17: São Pedro
2017-18: '''CD Falcões do Norte

See also
Sports in São Vicente, Cape Verde
São Vicente Premier Division
São Vicente Second Division
São Vicente Cup
São Vicente SuperCup

Notes

References

Sport in São Vicente, Cape Verde
Football cup competitions in Cape Verde
1999 establishments in Cape Verde